Kevin Kowalski (born March 27, 1992) is a professional skateboarder from Seal Rock, Oregon in the United States. He won the bronze medal in X Games 16 in skateboard park on August 1, 2010 and finished 2nd in bowl in the 2009 World Cup of Skateboarding.

References

American skateboarders
X Games athletes
Sportspeople from Oregon
Living people
1992 births
People from Lincoln County, Oregon